Windsor is a bus station and future Sonoma–Marin Area Rail Transit (SMART) train station in Windsor, California. The station served Sonoma County Transit and Mendocino Transit Authority, with service to Sonoma County Airport station provided by Sonoma County Transit under contract by SMART.

History

The station building was built by the Northwestern Pacific Railroad in the early 1900s. The station last served train passengers on the Northwestern Pacific Railroad in the late 1950s.

In 2008, the station building was rebuilt by the city for $1.4 million ($ in  adjusted for inflation) as an intermodal station in anticipation of serving passengers on the then-proposed Sonoma–Marin Area Rail Transit (SMART) commuter rail line. Service to Windsor Station was not included in the first phase of SMART, which began service as far north as the station near Charles M. Schulz–Sonoma County Airport in 2017.

Sonoma–Marin Area Rail Transit is constructing an extension to Windsor, with service further north to Healdsburg station and Cloverdale station in a future phase. The  extension is expected to cost $55 million: $20 million from Road Repair and Accountability Act funds, $30 million in Regional Measure 3 funds, and a $5 million federal grant. In September 2018, the SMART board approved $24 million in construction contracts, with service to Windsor expected to begin in late 2021 or early 2022. In 2020 the project completion was delayed to later in 2022 as funding from a recent bridge toll increase was withheld pending litigation. By spring of 2022 the SMART extension was 30% complete, but the lawsuit related to toll increases as well as a separate suit regarding use of the right-of-way had delayed the station's opening indefinitely.

The lawsuit was dismissed in January 2023, freeing up $40 million for SMART, and the agency received a $34 million state grant in February. At that time, SMART intended to wait until June 2023 to determine whether it would have sufficient funding to combine a further extension to Healdsburg with the completion of the Windsor extension. If the full $113 million in additional grants is received, Windsor service would begin in 2025 or 2026, and Healdsburg service by 2027.

References

External links
SMART - Stations
Sonoma County Transit - Windsor

Sonoma-Marin Area Rail Transit stations in Sonoma County
Future Sonoma–Marin Area Rail Transit stations
2008 establishments in California
Windsor, California
Bus stations in the San Francisco Bay Area
Former Northwestern Pacific Railroad stations